Staro-Almetevskaya Volost () was an administrative division (a volost) of Chistopol Uyezd of the Kazan Namestnichestvo until 1796, the Kazan Governorate from 1796 to 1920, then as part of the Chistopol Canton of the Tatar ASSR from 1920 to 1930.

The administrative center was Almetevo. In 1930, the volost was abolished and most of its territory was annexed to the Bilyarsky District. Now it is located in the Nurlatsky district.

Volost composition

Notes

Literature

External links 
 Tatar Encyclopaedic Dictionary
 
 Formation and Development of Zemstvo Medicine in Chistopol District

Kazan Governorate volosts
Types of administrative division